A.C.D. Nardò (usually referred to as simply Nardò) is an Italian association football club, based in Nardò, Apulia. It currently plays in Serie D.

History 
The club was founded in 1925 as U.S. Neritina.

Serie C 
It has a quite glorious past, with three seasons in the Italian Serie C, the former 3rd level of Italian football, between the 60s and the 70s and having won 3 Coppe Italia Regionali and 1 Coppa Italia di Serie D.

From the 1998–99 to the 2001–02 season it has played in Serie C2.

Radiation and refoundation 
On 6 November 2013 after renouncing to play four games in Serie D Nardò was removed by LND.

Before the 2014–15 season the club bought the sporting rights of ASD Copertino (from Copertino), establishing ACD Nardò. It was subsequently admitted to Eccellenza Pugliese.

Colors and badge 
The official color of the team is amaranth.

References

External links 
 Club website 
Fans homepage

Football clubs in Apulia
Nardò
Association football clubs established in 1925
Serie C clubs
1925 establishments in Italy